Lone Pine Capital is an American-based hedge fund and investment advisor headquartered in Greenwich, Connecticut, established in 1997 by its president and portfolio manager, Stephen Mandel. The firm has offices in London, New York City, and San Francisco.

Lone Pine Capital has provided its services to pooled investment vehicles, pension and profit sharing plans. The firm has invested in public equity markets across the globe.

Stephen Mandel previously worked for Julian Robertson at the firm Tiger Management, making Lone Pine one of the 30 or more so-called "Tiger Cubs," funds founded by managers who started their investment careers with Tiger Management.

As of March 31, 2021 Lone Pine Capital reported $36 billion under management.

References

External links
 Official website

Tiger Management
Investment management companies of the United States
1997 establishments in the United States
Hedge fund firms in Connecticut
Companies based in Greenwich, Connecticut
Financial services companies established in 1997
Privately held companies based in Connecticut